The Grande Tête de By is a mountain of the Pennine Alps, located on the border between Italy and Switzerland. With a height of 3,587 metres above sea level, it is the highest summit on the Italian side of the Grand Combin massif.

References

External links
 Grande Tête de By on Hikr

Mountains of the Alps
Alpine three-thousanders
Mountains of Switzerland
Mountains of Italy
Italy–Switzerland border
International mountains of Europe
Mountains of Valais